Liverpool Football Club is an English association football club based in Liverpool, Merseyside, which competes in the top tier of English football, for the 2022–23 season. The club was formed in 1892 following a disagreement between the board of Everton and club president John Houlding, who owned the club's ground, Anfield. The dispute over rent resulted in Everton leaving Anfield for Goodison Park, which left Houlding with an empty stadium. Not content for his ground to lay idle, he created his own club: Liverpool. Liverpool joined the Lancashire League on their foundation before the 1892–93 season. They ended their inaugural season as league champions, and were elected to The Football League soon afterwards. The club remained in The Football League until 1992, when its First Division was superseded as English football's top level by the newly formed Premier League.

Liverpool's first team have competed in a number of nationally and regionally contested leagues, and its record against each club faced in these competitions is listed below. The team that Liverpool have met most in league competition is Everton, against whom they have contested 208 league matches; having drawn 69 of these, Everton are the side Liverpool have tied with most in league competition. The team most often beaten by Liverpool in league competition are Aston Villa; the Anfield club have beaten them 93 times out of 189 meetings. Manchester United have recorded the most league victories over Liverpool, with 69 wins.

Key
The records include the results of matches played in the Lancashire League (from 1892 to 1893), The Football League (from 1893 to 1992) and the Premier League (from 1992 to the present day). Wartime matches are regarded as unofficial and are excluded, as are matches from the abandoned 1939–40 season.
For the sake of simplicity, present-day names are used throughout: for example, results against Newton Heath, Leicester Fosse and Woolwich Arsenal are integrated into the records against Manchester United, Leicester City and Arsenal, respectively.
The season given as the "first" denotes the season in which Liverpool first played a league match against that team.
The season given as the "last" denotes the season in which Liverpool last played a league match against that team.
  Teams with this background and symbol in the "Club" column are current divisional rivals of Liverpool.
  Clubs with this background and symbol in the "Club" column are defunct.
P = matches played; W = matches won; D = matches drawn; L = matches lost; Win% = percentage of total matches won

All-time league record
Statistics correct as of match played 11 March 2023.

Overall record

 Statistics correct as of 11 March 2023.

Footnotes

References

League Record By Opponent
Liverpool